Flavipin is a phototoxic, antibiotic and antifungal metabolite with the molecular formula C9H8O5 which is produced by the fungi Aspergillus flavipes, Epicoccum nigrum and Epicoccum andropogonis. Flavipin is also a potent antioxidant.

References

Further reading 

 
 
 

Antibiotics
Benzaldehydes
Triols
Phenols
Alkylbenzenes